Ectoedemia clemensella is a moth of the family Nepticulidae. It is found in Pennsylvania, Kentucky, Maryland, North Carolina, and Ohio.

The wingspan is 4.5-5.2 mm. There are three generations per year.

The larvae feed on Platanus occidentalis. They mine the leaves of their host plant. The mine is linear, gradually increasing in breadth, with its terminal portion expanded into a small blotch three or four times the diameter of the end of the linear mine. The larvae are pale green and the cocoon is ochraceous.

References

External links
Nepticulidae of North America

Moths described in 1873
Nepticulidae
Moths of North America